Although elements of fashion design copyright may be traced in Europe to as early as the 15th century, as of 2016 most countries (including the United States and the United Kingdom) fashion design does not have the same protection as other creative works (art, film, literature, etc.), because apparel (clothes, shoes, handbags, etc.) are classified as "functional items", excluded from protection by copyright laws. This explains the success of the knockoff businesses to the detriment of both the established labels, as well as of emerging designers, the latter ones being especially damaged, because they rely on relatively few designs.

History
French king Francis I gave out specific privileges related to the production of textiles. By 1711, in Lyon, illegalities were already being defined in regards to fashion materials, and in 1787, in England and Scotland fashion designers had fruitfully pushed their needs for protection into basic legislation. In 1876 Germany began protecting fashion patterns as well as models, and in 2002 European regulation on designs that were new and provided an aspect of fresh character or aesthetic were brought under protection. From 2004 to 2006 the "total production volume for clothing decreased by about 5% each year... [and by] 2006 the European union trade deficit for clothing was at 33.7 billion." These statistics show that while there are benefits of their advanced design legislation, the economic and external factors still hindered their industry growth in ways the U.S. can empathize with. As 2007 came to a close, WIPO, or the World Intellectual Property Organization, had registered twenty-nine international designs.

Current regulation
There are some elements of protection of fashion design, with limited effectiveness.  The copyright law covers creative elements of fashion designs, such as print patterns. Trademark law protects items with visibly displayed protected logos. Intellectual property laws protect "trade dress", which is an appearance of a product which uniquely identifies its source to the level of a trademark.

Some countries introduced other laws to protect fashion design; however, the protection is inconsistent around the world.

European Union
In the European Union, the Creative Designs Directive and the European Designs Directive are in effect to protect new designs for three or five years.

United States

In the 2017 Supreme Court case. Star Athletica, LLC v. Varsity Brands, Inc., it was ruled that Fashion design can be covered by copyright.

Societal impact 
Researcher Johanna Blakley argues that the very lack of regulation of fashion design has allowed the fashion industry to do very well economically and has led to the birth of fast fashion and a much faster changing of fashion trends and has enabled pieces of clothing to become pieces of art. She also refers to Tom Ford pointing out that the people who buy cheap lookalikes are a different demographic compared with people who buy the original very high-end products and that while many exclusive designers get copied, also the high end designers often attribute the inspiration of their creations to following street fashion, so the copying is a two-way street.

See also 
Design patent

Further reading
 Protection for Fashion Design
 How Is Fashion Protected by Copyright Law?
 young-fashion Damenmode von Lucie & Leo (in German)
 Fashion Design and Copyright in the US and EU

References 

Fashion design
Copyright law